Temple of the Five Immortals, Five Immortals Temple, or Temple of the Five Genii may refer to

 Temple of the Five Immortals (Shiyan), in Hubei, China
 Temple of the Five Immortals (Guangzhou), in Guangdong, China

See also
Hualin Temple (Guangzhou), or Temple of the Five Hundred Genii, in Guangzhou, China.